The 2019 Wakefield Metropolitan Borough Council election took place on 2 May 2019 to elect members of Wakefield Metropolitan District Council in England. The election was held on the same day as other local elections. The Labour Party and the Conservative Party fielded a full slate of 21 candidates, as well as 14 Liberal Democrats, 8 Yorkshire Party candidates, 7 UK Independence Party candidates, 6 Green Party candidates, 6 Independent candidates, 1 Socialist Alternative candidate and 1 Democrats and Veteran's Party candidate.

Council make-up 
The make up of the Council following the election was:

Summary 

 
 +/- compared with Wakefield Council election 2018.

Ward results

Ackworth, North Elmsall and Upton ward

Airedale and Ferry Fryston ward 
Around a year after his election, Alex Kear was jailed after arranging to meet with a three-year-old girl for sexual abuse.

Altofts and Whitwood ward

Castleford Central and Glasshoughton ward

Crofton, Ryhill and Walton ward

Featherstone ward

Hemsworth ward

Horbury and South Ossett ward

Knottingley ward

Normanton ward

Ossett ward

Pontefract North ward

Pontefract South

South Elmsall and South Kirkby ward

Stanley and Outwood East ward

Wakefield East ward

Wakefield North ward

Wakefield Rural ward

Wakefield South ward

Wakefield West ward

Wrenthorpe and Outwood West ward

Notes

References 

2019
2019 English local elections
May 2019 events in the United Kingdom
2010s in West Yorkshire